Ponsonby Fell is a hill in the west of the English Lake District, near Gosforth, in the Borough of Copeland, Cumbria. It is the subject of a chapter of Wainwright's book The Outlying Fells of Lakeland. It reaches , and Wainwright's route is an anticlockwise horseshoe starting at Gosforth, following the River Bleng before striking north for the summit, then descending to Wellington from where he recommends taking a bus back to Gosforth rather than walk along the A595 road ("it is busy, dangerous, and has no footpath").

Wainwright says: "There are no fells not worth climbing, but Ponsonby Fell is very nearly in their category", and describes the summit as "attained with a conviction that nobody has ever been there before", which conviction is then contradicted by the presence of a small cairn.

References
 

Fells of the Lake District
Borough of Copeland